Inape papallactana is a species of moth of the family Tortricidae. It is found in Pichincha Province, Ecuador.

References

Moths described in 1999
Endemic fauna of Ecuador
Moths of South America
papallactana
Taxa named by Józef Razowski